The café wall illusion is a geometrical-optical illusion in which the parallel straight dividing lines between staggered rows with alternating dark and light "bricks" appear to be sloped, not parallel as they really are.

It was first described under the name Kindergarten illusion in 1898, and re-discovered in 1973 by Richard Gregory. According to Gregory, this effect was observed by a member of his laboratory, Steve Simpson, in the tiles of the wall of a café at the bottom of St Michael's Hill, Bristol. It is a variant of the shifted-chessboard illusion originated by Hugo Münsterberg.

In the construction of the optical illusion often each "brick" is surrounded by a layer of "mortar" intermediate between the dark and light colours of the "bricks".

In the first attempt at its deconstruction, the illusion was ascribed largely to the irradiation illusion (apparent greater size of a white area than of a black one), and the image disappears when black and white are replaced by different colours of the same brightness. But a component of the illusion remains even when all optical and retinal components are factored out. Contrast polarities seem to be the determining factor in the tilt's direction.

See also
Visual illusions
Geometrical-optical illusions

References

External links
An interactive web app for demonstrating the Café wall illusion
An interactive version of the Café wall illusion that allows for adjusting the offset and turning the black boxes into white boxes
An animated proof that the horizontal lines are parallel and straight
The original café in Bristol on Google Maps Street View

Optical illusions